Vivahitha is a 1970 Indian Malayalam film, directed by M. Krishnan Nair and produced by A. L. Sreenivasan. The film stars Prem Nazir, Sathyan, Padmini and Sukumari in the lead roles. The film had musical score by G. Devarajan. The film was a remake of the Hindi film Gumrah (1963).

Cast 

Prem Nazir
Sathyan as Ashok, a barrister
Padmini as Meena
Sukumari
Jayabharathi
Kaviyoor Ponnamma as Kamala, Ashok's wife
Adoor Bhasi
Muthukulam Raghavan Pillai
T. S. Muthaiah as Sreedharan, a planter, Kamala and Meena's father
Baby Rajani
K. P. Ummer
Ushakumari
Mythili

Soundtrack

References

External links 
 

1970 films
1970s Malayalam-language films
Malayalam remakes of Hindi films
Films with screenplays by Thoppil Bhasi
Films directed by M. Krishnan Nair